Swift Justice is an American detective drama television series created by Dick Wolf and Richard Albarino. It aired for one season on United Paramount Network (UPN) from March 13 to July 17, 1996. It follows former Navy SEAL Mac Swift (James McCaffrey), a private investigator who was fired from the New York City Police Department. He receives support from his former partner Detective Randall Patterson (Gary Dourdan) and his father Al Swift (Len Cariou). Completed on a limited budget, episodes were filmed on location in New York.

Critics noted Swift Justice's emphasis on violence, specifically in the pilot episode's opening sequence, comparing it to the crime drama The Equalizer (1985–1989) and the 1988 film Die Hard. UPN canceled the program after receiving complaints from viewers, advertisers, and critics of its violent scenes. Wolf considered the cancellation a mistake due to the show's good ratings. The series was praised for its visuals and McCaffrey's performance, but criticized as being either too violent or formulaic.

Premise and characters
A detective drama, Swift Justice follows Mac Swift (James McCaffrey), a former United States Navy SEAL who joins the New York City Police Department (NYPD). He is aided by his best friend and partner, Detective Randall Patterson (Gary Dourdan), but is frequently reprimanded by his police sergeant father Al Swift (Len Cariou) and other superiors, including Andrew Coffin (Giancarlo Esposito). The pilot episode focuses on Mac's attempts to arrest a man (Skipp Sudduth) who runs a prostitution ring as part of a honey trap involving extortion, drugs, and credit card information. For the case, he collaborates with a prostitute, Annie (Kim Dickens), and becomes romantically involved with her. She turned to the profession to pay for her college tuition and her mother's nursing home bills. When Annie is murdered, Mac's behavior becomes increasingly erratic and violent, leading to his termination from the police department at the end of the pilot.

In subsequent episodes, Mac works as a private investigator who assists those "denied [help] because of the rules of conventional law enforcement". He helps people by improving their chances against criminals in court, rather than by vigilantism. Portrayed as experienced with computers, Mac is financially stable due to royalty payments from software he has developed. He sets up an email address to receive messages from his clients. According to a publicity note from United Paramount Network (UPN), Mac relies on "technology, intellect, charisma[,] and muscle" to solve cases. The network promoted the character as "a true crime fighter of the technology-driven 90's". Throughout the season, Randall provides information about cases to Mac. Al is demoted from being a beat officer to working at a desk.

Storylines include a rock singer who is denied a divorce from her abusive husband, a woman whose son is kidnapped by her ex-husband, and a man who ties up and tortures his victims by driving them with golf balls. Guest appearances include Jennifer Garner, Drea de Matteo, and Ice-T. Many commentators noted the show's use of violence, particularly that the pilot's opening sequence involves nine deaths. Despite its frequent inclusion of violent scenes, the show does not show blood or gore. Critics compared the violence in Swift Justice to the crime drama The Equalizer and the 1988 action movie Die Hard, and the Orlando Sentinel'''s Hal Boedeker identified it as an "urban western". Co-creator and executive producer Dick Wolf likened the series to "Batman without the mask", and characterized its tone as politically incorrect. He based Mac on the gunfighter Paladin from Have Gun – Will Travel and compared his friendship with Randall to Martin Riggs' partnership with Roger Murtaugh in the Lethal Weapon films.

Production and broadcast history

Produced by Wolf Films in association with Universal Television, Swift Justice was created by Wolf and Richard Albarino. According to New York's Maureen Callahan, the episodes, shot on location in New York, were low-budget productions. During filming, Jean-Claude La Marre, who guest starred as a hustler, was nearly arrested by a police officer. La Marre accused him of racial profiling. Representatives from Swift Justice and the NYPD did not comment on the incident. Rick Marotta produced the music, which Variety's Todd Everett described as having a good synthesizer- and percussion-based sound. Swift Justice was the first time that Gary Glasberg wrote for an hour-long television program. Referring to the experience as his "big break", he would later be a showrunner for the police procedural NCIS.Swift Justice was part of UPN's "aggressive new spring schedule" that expanded the network's programming to three nights per week. Picked up as a mid-season replacement, the series was broadcast on Wednesday nights at 9:00 pm EST. Thirteen episodes aired between March and July 1996. Rocky Mountain News' Dusty Saunders cited the series as an example of the network shifting toward action-adventure programming. Mediaweek's Scotty Dupree wrote that Swift Justice and The Sentinel were meant to attract a male audience, saying they were the only shows, aside from JAG, marketed to men on Wednesday nights. Wolf specified the target audiences of males as being aged 18 to 34.Swift Justices pilot episode was shown with a viewer advisory regarding its violence. During the show's broadcast, watchdog organizations and viewers were critical of the representation of violence on television. UPN canceled Swift Justice, Nowhere Man, Minor Adjustments, and The Paranormal Borderline, in favor of black sitcoms. The network decided to remove Swift Justice from its schedule following viewer and advertiser complaints about its violence.  During a 2013 interview with the Academy of Television Arts & Sciences, Wolf referred to the decision to end Swift Justice as a "cancellation error", particularly since UPN did not have a drama with comparable ratings at the time. Following the show's cancellation, when Wolf was casting for the television productions Players and Exiled: A Law & Order Movie in the late 1990s, he again hired Ice-T, who has noted that Wolf often collaborated with the same actors.

Episodes

Critical reception
Critics praised Swift Justice for its visuals, although some criticized the storylines as unoriginal. Variety's Todd Everett and the Chicago Tribune's Steve Johnson found fault with the show for relying on clichés, but both enjoyed the look of the show. Everett wrote that Swift Justice was the most visually attractive program on UPN, and Johnson that it had "a visceral, close-to-the-streets feel". Judy Nichols of The Christian Science Monitor likewise commented on the "fast-moving action" and "spurts of breakneck-pace camera work". By contrast, The Boston Globes Frederic M. Biddle felt the visuals alone could not carry the show,  saying that they did not justify the frequent violence scenes. Biddle described the series as "utterly empty at its soul" underneath its "over the top in slick visuals".

James McCaffrey and his character received a positive response from critics. The New York Times John O'Connor praised the show for characterizing him as an action hero with a sensitive side. People's Tom Gliatto and The Virginian-Pilot's Larry Bonko singled out McCaffrey for his handsomeness. Gliatto described him as "handsome, but neither too impressed nor too pretty to buy as an action lead", and Bonko called him attractively toughened. The Virginian-Pilot's Larry Bonko said casting him was a perfect choice.

The show's frequent use of violence was criticized. Panning the premise as unrealistic, Scott D. Pierce of the Deseret News summed up the series as "full of violence, questionable messages, violence and more violence". The San Francisco Chronicles John Carman described Swift Justice as a "competent action show", but felt that "it isn't good enough to compensate for its excesses". Some commentators criticized the series' plot as generic. In their 2007 book Season Finale: The Unexpected Rise and Fall of The WB and UPN, Susanne Daniels and Cynthia Littleton dismissed Swift Justice as a "run-of-the-mill gumshoe drama". Hal Boedeker of the Orlando Sentinel referred to the show as "an unpleasant throwback to the 1980s". Howard Rosenberg, writing for the Los Angeles Times'', was critical of the pilot episode for its plot holes, and Gliatto described the episodes as having "some of the dumbest villains in the annals of crime".

References

Citations

Book sources

External links
 

1996 American television series debuts
1996 American television series endings
1990s American crime drama television series
American detective television series
Fictional portrayals of the New York City Police Department
Television series created by Dick Wolf
Television series by Wolf Films
UPN original programming
Television shows set in New York City